Kuabang Airport , also known as Kao Airport, is an airport located near Jati Village, serving the coastal town of Kao, North Halmahera Regency, North Maluku, Indonesia. The airport currently only serves daily domestic flights to Manado operated by Wings Air using the ATR-72 aircraft.

The airport was originally built by the Empire of Japan at the midst of the Pacific War of World War II. After the Japanese surrendered, the airport was neglected for several years before the Indonesian Ministry of Transportation decided to reactivate the airport to improve air connection to the surrounding area. In 1972, a CN-235 successfully landed smoothly on the airport runway, marking the completion of the reactivation of the airport.

Airlines and destinations

Passenger

References 

Airports in North Maluku